Alfred James Reach (May 25, 1840 – January 14, 1928) was an Anglo-American sportsman who, after becoming one of the early stars of baseball in the National Association, went on to become an influential executive, publisher, sporting goods manufacturer and spokesman for the sport.

Born in London, Reach was a regular for the champion Eckford club of Brooklyn in the early 1860s before moving to the Philadelphia Athletics in 1865. When the National Association began, he helped them win the first professional baseball pennant in 1871. Upon his retirement from playing in 1875, he helped found the Philadelphia Phillies franchise. Reach served as team president from 1883 to 1899. Later, similarly to Albert Spalding, Reach formed a sporting goods company and earned millions. In fact, he sold his company to Spalding in 1889. Reach was the trade name used on the game balls for the American League until 1976.

Reach kept his interest in the Phillies franchise, selling to a syndicate led by James Potter in 1903. Reach died at age 87 in Atlantic City, New Jersey, and is interred at West Laurel Hill Cemetery in Bala Cynwyd, Pennsylvania.

A Pennsylvania historical marker was dedicated on April 4, 2003 at 1820 Chestnut Street in Philadelphia for Reach's contribution to baseball.

References

External links

Major League Baseball right fielders
Major League Baseball players from the United Kingdom
Major League Baseball players from England
English baseball players
Brooklyn Eckfords (NABBP) players
Philadelphia Athletics (NABBP) players
Philadelphia Athletics (NA) players
Philadelphia Phillies managers
Philadelphia Phillies owners
Philadelphia Athletic players
Baseball executives
19th-century baseball players
1840 births
1928 deaths
Sportspeople from London
Burials at West Laurel Hill Cemetery